Robert J. Tennessen (born August 24, 1939) is an American politician in the state of Minnesota. He served in the Minnesota Senate.

References

1939 births
Living people
Democratic Party Minnesota state senators
People from Nobles County, Minnesota
Politicians from Minneapolis
University of Minnesota Law School alumni